Rebecca Parchment is a beauty queen who represented the Cayman Islands in Miss Universe 2008 and Miss World 2007.

Early life
Parchment graduated from the University of Central Florida with a Bachelor’s degree in Business Administration and also majored in Marketing.

Pageants
Parchment is the only delegate who participated at both Miss World 2007 and Miss Universe 2008, and is one of the oldest contestants who took part in both competitions.

Parchment sang and helped assist Mandla Mandela and a children's choir from South Africa on World AIDS Day during the Miss World 2007 pageant won by Zhang Zilin.

In August 2008 she passed on her Miss Cayman Islands crown to Nicosia Lawson.

References

External links 
 Official Miss Cayman Islands website - Past titleholders

1982 births
Living people
Caymanian models
Miss Universe 2008 contestants
Miss World 2007 delegates
University of Central Florida alumni
Caymanian beauty pageant winners